Valve stenosis may refer to:
 Pulmonary valve stenosis
 Aortic valve stenosis
 Mitral valve stenosis